, formerly known as Irumagawa stable from 1993 to 2023, is a stable of sumo wrestlers, part of the Dewanoumi  ichimon or group of stables. It was set up in January 1993 by former sekiwake Tochitsukasa, who branched off from Kasugano stable. As of February 2023 it had seven wrestlers.

History
The stable has recruited the Ukrainian Sergey Sokolovsky who made his debut in March 2020, making Ukraine the 24th different foreign country or territory to have a wrestler join professional sumo. On 26 January 2023 it was announced that Irumagawa, in anticipation of his mandatory retirement in April, would give control of his stable to coach Ikazuchi (former komusubi Kakizoe) without him inheriting the Irumagawa elder name. The stable name change took effect six days later on 1 February, creating the first incarnation of the Ikazuchi stable in 62 years. In addition, the board meeting of the Japan Sumo Association approved the transfer of coach Wakafuji (former Ōtsukasa) to Kise stable the following month.

Ring name conventions
Many wrestlers at this stable take ring names or shikona that end with the character 司 (read: tsukasa), meaning boss, in deference to former coach and stable owner, the former Tochitsukasa.

Owner
2023-present: 17th Ikazuchi Tōru (iin, former komusubi Kakizoe)
1993-2023: 16th Irumagawa Tetsuo (yakuin taigu iin, former sekiwake Tochitsukasa)

Coach
Irumagawa Tetsuo (yakuin taigu iin, former sekiwake Tochitsukasa)

Notable former wrestlers
Masatsukasa (former maegashira)
Ōtsukasa (former maegashira)
Sagatsukasa (former maegashira)
Yōtsukasa (former maegashira)

Referee
Kimura Narimasa (jonidan gyoji, real name Narimasa Tajima)

Hairdresser
Tokokuwa (second class tokoyama)

Location
Hachiouji 3-32-12, Saitama City, Saitama

See also
List of sumo stables
List of active sumo wrestlers
List of past sumo wrestlers
Glossary of sumo terms

References

External links
Japan Sumo Association profile

Active sumo stables